Gerald Ostroski Jr. (born July 12, 1970) is a former American football offensive lineman who played for the Buffalo Bills in the National Football League.

College career
After a standout high school career at Owen J. Roberts High School, Jerry Ostroski played college football at The University of Tulsa, starting every game as a sophomore, junior, and senior. He was selected first-team All-American in 1991 after leading TU to a 10–2 season and victory in the Freedom Bowl. In 1999, Ostroski was named to Tulsa's All-Century Team. On October 27, 2018, Tulsa retired Ostroski’s No. 55 jersey.

Professional career
Ostroski played 106 games (8 years) in the NFL, all with the Bills; he started 102 games at the center, offensive guard, and offensive tackle positions. In his 7th year, 2000, the last of three under head coach Wade Phillips, when the Bills had an 8–8 won-lost record, Ostroski became their starting center, replacing Dusty Zeigler who went to play with the Giants, playing between left guard Ruben Brown and right guard Jamie Nails in all 16 games. However, in 2001, Bill Conaty became the center and Ostroski showed his versatility again and moved to right guard.

After recovering from a broken leg in the 2001 preseason, he injured a knee late in the season versus the Atlanta Falcons. Ostroski won the Ed Block Courage Award in 2001.

Due to his knee injury, Ostroski retired on August 27, 2002.

References

1970 births
Living people
American football offensive guards
Tulsa Golden Hurricane football players
Buffalo Bills players
Ed Block Courage Award recipients